Tribimaximal mixing is a specific postulated form for the Pontecorvo–Maki–Nakagawa–Sakata (PMNS) lepton mixing matrix U. Tribimaximal mixing is defined by a particular choice of the matrix of moduli-squared of the elements of the PMNS matrix as follows:

This mixing is presently excluded by experiment at the level of 5σ.

The tribimaximal mixing form was compatible with much older neutrino oscillation experiments and may be used as a zeroth-order approximation to more general forms for the PMNS matrix, for example those which are also consistent with the data. In the PDG convention for the PMNS matrix, tribimaximal mixing may be specified in terms of lepton mixing angles as follows:

The above prediction has been falsified experimentally, because θ13 was found to be nontrivial,  θ13 =8.5°.
 
A non-negligible value of  θ13 has been foreseen in certain theoretical schemes that were put forward before tribimaximal mixing and that 
supported a large solar mixing, before it was confirmed experimentally (these theoretical schemes do not have a special name, but for the reasons explained above, they could be called pre-tribimaximal or also non-tribimaximal). This situation is not new: also in the 1990s, the solar mixing angle was supposed to be small by most theorists, until KamLAND proved the contrary to be true.

Explanation of name
The name tribimaximal reflects the commonality of the tribimaximal mixing matrix with two previously proposed specific forms for the PMNS matrix, the trimaximal and bimaximal mixing schemes, both now ruled out by data.

Phenomenology

By virtue of the zero in the tribimaximal mixing matrix, exact tribimaximal mixing would predict zero for all CP-violating asymmetries in the case of Dirac neutrinos (in the case of Majorana neutrinos, Majorana phases are still permitted, and could still lead to CP-violating effects).

The bimaximally mixed  in tribimaximal mixing accounts for the factor of two suppression  observed for atmospheric muon-neutrinos (and confirmed in long-baseline accelerator experiments). Near-zero  appearance in a  beam is predicted in exact tribimaximal mixing, and future experiments may well rule this out. Further characteristic predictions of tribimaximal mixing – e.g. for very long baseline  and  vacuum survival probabilities  – will be extremely hard to test experimentally.

The L/E flatness of the electron-like event ratio at Super-Kamiokande severely restricts the neutrino mixing matrices to the form given by Stancu & Ahluwalia (1999):

Additional experimental data fixes  The extension of this result to the CP-violating case is found in Ahluwalia, Liu, & Stancu (2002).

History
The name tribimaximal first appeared in the literature in 2002 although this specific scheme had been previously published in 1999 as a viable alternative to the trimaximal scheme. Tribimaximal mixing is sometimes confused with other mixing schemes, e.g. which differ from tribimaximal mixing by row- and/or column-wise permutations of the mixing-matrix elements. Such permuted forms are experimentally distinct however, and are now ruled out by data.

That the L/E flatness of the electron-like event ratio at Superkamiokande severely restricts the neutrino mixing matrices was first presented by D. V. Ahluwalia in a Nuclear and Particle Physics Seminar of the Los Alamos National Laboratory on June 5, 1998. It was just a few hours after the Super-Kamiokande press conference that announced the results on atmospheric neutrinos.

References

Leptons
Standard Model
Particle physics
Neutrinos